Adam Henderson (16 July 1873–unknown) was an English footballer who played in the Football League for Preston North End.

References

1873 births
Date of death unknown
English footballers
Association football forwards
English Football League players
Airdrieonians F.C. (1878) players
Preston North End F.C. players
Celtic F.C. players
Gravesend United F.C. players